Anbaqin (also Romanized as Anbaqīn; also known as ‘Amaqīn, Ambakin, and Ammehghin) is a village in Khandan Rural District, Tarom Sofla District, Qazvin County, Qazvin Province, Iran. At the 2006 census, its population was 177, in 65 families.

References 

Populated places in Qazvin County